Margaret Neilson Armstrong  (1867–1944) was a 20th-century American designer, illustrator, and author. She is best known for her book covers in the Art Nouveau style. She also wrote and illustrated the first comprehensive guide to wildflowers of the American west, Field Book of Western Wild Flowers (1915). In later life she wrote mystery novels and biographies.

Life
Margaret Neilson Armstrong was born on September 24, 1867, in New York City, the  daughter of American diplomat and stained glass artist Maitland Armstrong and his wife Helen, who was a descendant of Peter Stuyvesant and a niece of Hamilton Fish. Her six siblings included Helen Maitland Armstrong (1869–1948), who followed in her father's footsteps to become a stained glass artist, and Hamilton Fish Armstrong, a magazine editor.

She began her career as a designer in the 1880s, working initially for A.C. McClurg and later for other publishers as well. She designed more than 270 book covers and book bindings, about half of which were for Scribner's. She worked in the Art Nouveau style and favored plant-related motifs, bold colors, gold stamping, and often slightly asymmetrical designs—an unusual combination that helped to distinguish her among her peers. Authors for whom she designed several covers include Frances Hodgson Burnett, Florence L. Barclay, George Washington Cable, Charles Dickens, Paul Laurence Dunbar, Robert Louis Stevenson, Henry van Dyke, and Myrtle Reed. She has been called "the most productive and accomplished American book designer of the 1890s and early 1900s", and her work is often compared to that of her contemporary Alice Cordelia Morse.

Her monogram appears on many covers after 1895; it is a simple 'MA' in upper case with the 'M' slightly overlapping the 'A'.

Armstrong cut back on book cover design around 1913 as dust jackets began to come into fashion and turned to writing her own books. (Her signature style was so successful, however, that publishers then hired artists specifically to imitate her look.)

An avid naturalist, Armstrong's passion for natural forms reflected her interest in botany and in particular, in wildflowers. During the 1911-1914 period, she traveled and camped throughout the Western United States and Canada, becoming one of the first women to reach the bottom of the Grand Canyon. She discovered there several species of flowers that had not yet been identified by botanists. She details those and many other species in her Field Book of Western Wild Flowers (1915). With its 550 illustrations (48 of which were in color), her Field Book is considered the first comprehensive guide on the subject. In her sixties and seventies, she wrote three critically praised mystery novels—Murder in Stained Glass (1939), The Man with No Face (1940), and The Blue Santo Murder Mystery (1941)—and two biographies, Fanny Kemble: A Passionate Victorian (1938) and Trelawny: A Man's Life (1940). She also completed her father's memoirs.

She died in New York City in 1944.

Her work is represented in the Metropolitan Museum of Art's collections and the collections of the New York Botanical Garden.

Books
Field Book of Western Wild Flowers (1915)
Five Generations (1930)
Fanny Kemble: A Passionate Victorian (1938)
Murder in Stained Glass (1939)
Trelawny: A Man's Life (1940)
The Man With No Face (1940)
The Blue Santo Murder Mystery (1941)

References

External links

 

Margaret Armstrong Binding Collection The Rare Book and Special Collection Division at the Library of Congress
"Margaret Armstrong Decorated Bindings Collection"
Miriam Irwin Collection of Margaret Armstrong Book Design
Gullens, et al. Margaret Armstrong and American Trade Bindings: with a checklist of her designed bindings and covers, 1991. (Archive.org)
New York Botanic Garden broadcast 19.30 min onwards 12 March 2019

1867 births
1944 deaths
Artists from New York City
American women illustrators
American illustrators
20th-century American artists
20th-century American non-fiction writers
20th-century American novelists
American designers
Book designers
American mystery novelists
Botanical illustrators
American botanical writers
American biographers
American women biographers
20th-century American women writers
20th-century American women artists
Women mystery writers
Women science writers
American women novelists
Novelists from New York (state)
Historians from New York (state)
Scientists from New York (state)
Women graphic designers